Anna Bieleń-Żarska (born 22 July 1979) is a former Polish tennis player.

Bieleń-Żarska was born in Kędzierzyn-Koźle. She won four singles and five doubles titles on the ITF Women's Circuit. On 3 April 2000, she reached her best singles ranking of world No. 146. On 30 July 2001, she peaked at No. 176 in the doubles rankings.

ITF finals

Singles: 10 (4–6)

Doubles: 13 (5–8)

References
 
 
 

1979 births
Living people
People from Kędzierzyn-Koźle
Polish female tennis players
Universiade medalists in tennis
Sportspeople from Opole Voivodeship
Universiade silver medalists for Poland
20th-century Polish women
21st-century Polish women